The 2007–08 Ivy League men's basketball season was the Ivy League's 54th season of basketball.  Cornell University won the league title with a perfect 14-0 record in league play and was the Ivy League's representative at the 2008 NCAA Division I men's basketball tournament, snapping a 19-year streak of the Ivy League sending either University of Pennsylvania or Princeton University to the tournament. Louis Dale of Cornell was the Ivy League Men's Basketball Player of the Year.

All-Ivy Teams

NCAA tournament

References